Tandu may also refer to:

 Tandu, Linxiang (坦渡镇), a town in Linxiang city, China
 DJ Tandu (born 1966), German  trance producer and DJ
 Tandu Khatun, ruler of the Jalairid Sultanate in Iraq
 Tandu , fictional extraterrestrial species from David Brin's Uplift Universe